Daha  is a village development committee in Kalikot District in the Karnali Zone of north-western Nepal. At the time of the 1991 Nepal census it had a population of 3242 people living in 613 individual households.

References

External links
UN map of the municipalities of Kalikot District

Populated places in Kalikot District